Harold David Burton (born April 25, 1938) was the thirteenth Presiding Bishop of the Church of Jesus Christ of Latter-day Saints (LDS Church) from 1995 to 2012 and has been the chairman of the University of Utah (U of U) board of trustees since 2016.

Born in Salt Lake City, Utah, to Latter-day Saint parents, Burton graduated from South High School in 1956 and then served as a missionary for the LDS Church in southern Australia in the late 1950s. He graduated from the U of U with a bachelor's degree in economics and completed an MBA from the University of Michigan. Early in his career, Burton worked for the Utah Tax Commission and for Kennecott Copper.

LDS Church service
Burton was hired by the LDS Church as the assistant budget officer in 1977. Burton later accepted a position as the executive secretary to the church's presiding bishopric. In October 1992, Burton was called by Robert D. Hales as first counselor in the presiding bishopric. In 1994, he was again called as first counselor to the new presiding bishop, Merrill J. Bateman. On December 27, 1995, when Bateman became the president of Brigham Young University, Burton became the church's Presiding Bishop--a post roughly equivalent to chief operating officer. Burton called Richard C. Edgley as his first counselor and Keith B. McMullin as his second counselor. 

Burton was a prominent voice from the LDS Church on the issue of Utah immigration legislation in 2011. Burton oversaw the LDS Church's $1.5 billion mixed-use development project called City Creek Center in downtown Salt Lake City. Burton and his counselors were released on 31 March 2012 and designated as emeritus general authorities.

Civic service
In 2014, Burton was elected chairman of the board of the Utah Transit Authority. He has been on the U of U's board of trustees since 2013 and was selected as chairman in 2016. While chair, the U of U joined the prestigious Association of American Universities prompting Burton to remark, "We already knew that the U was one of the jewels of Utah and of the Intermountain West, this invitation shows that we are one of the jewels of the entire nation".

Personal life
Burton married Barbara Matheson in September 1960, and they are the parents of five children.

See also 

 Council on the Disposition of the Tithes
 Finances of The Church of Jesus Christ of Latter-day Saints

References

External links
H. David Burton Official profile
University of Utah Board of Trustees

1938 births
20th-century Mormon missionaries
American Mormon missionaries in Australia
American general authorities (LDS Church)
Counselors in the Presiding Bishopric (LDS Church)
Latter Day Saints from Michigan
Latter Day Saints from Utah
Living people
Presiding Bishops (LDS Church)
Ross School of Business alumni
University of Utah alumni